Malaquías Concha Ortíz (5 April 1859 – 5 August 1921) was a Chilean writer, lawyer and politician.

Biography

Early life
Her parents were Raimundo Concha Rodríguez and Juana María Ortiz Lobos. He studied at the Colegio del Padre Concha and the Liceo de Talca. Then he moved to Santiago to study Law at University of Chile, from which he graduated in 1881. He graduated as a lawyer on 24 December 1880.

Political career
His political participation began in his university years. When he was 22, he installed his law firm and acquired renown and prestige due to his dedication to defend people's causes without financial means. He joined the Radical Party and he separated from it in 1887 to create the Democratic Party. There, he promoted political life democratization through universal suffrage or secular and free education. His followers were workers and artisans who under his protection promoted the social question.

He supported President José Manuel Balmaceda during the 1891 Chilean Civil War. Once the side of the President was defeated, he was convicted between 1891 and 1893 being accused of conspiracy. He had to hide from frequent attacks from his opponents when he recovered his freedom.

In 1896, his Democratic Party joined the Liberal Alliance and he was elected deputy for Concepción, Talcahuano, Lautaro and Coelemu (1900–1912), Concepción (1912–1915) and Temuco, Nueva Imperial and Llaima (1915–1918). In 1915 he was appointed Minister of Industry and Public Works under Juan Luis Sanfuentes period. He was elected senator for Concepción in 1918.

See also
 History of Chile during the Parliamentary Era (1891–1925)

References

1859 births
1921 deaths
Members of the Senate of Chile
Members of the Chamber of Deputies of Chile
Chilean political writers
University of Chile alumni